Green River Lake is a  reservoir in Adair, Taylor, and Casey counties in Kentucky lying in the section of Kentucky known as the Highland Rim.

The lake was developed by the United States Army Corps of Engineers in 1969 by impounding the Green River. The dam is an 11-mile drive equidistant from the cities of Campbellsville and Columbia. The lake is located 90 miles southeast of Louisville.

Operated and maintained primarily for flood control, the lake has become the major attraction of Green River Lake State Park.

Green River Lake Dam
The earthen dam (National ID # KY03007, at ), owned and operated by the Corps of Engineers, stands 144 feet high, with a length of 2350 feet at its crest. The US$33.4 million construction cost of the Green River Lake Project was authorized by the Flood Control Act of 1938.

Green River Lake is the largest project in the Louisville District—counting both the land and water acreage (33,793 acres). The Green River is the longest river, at 370 miles, to flow completely within the Commonwealth of Kentucky's borders. Green River Lake also is home to the first Interpretative Center, opened in 1972, in the Louisville Engineer District.

Benefits of the Lake
According to the US Army Corps of Engineers website: "Green River Lake has prevented over $123.39 million in flood damages since impoundment, and in fiscal year 2008 alone the lake generated approximately $34.75 million in visitor expenditures. In addition to flood protection and recreation, Corps lakes provide immeasurable benefits to the local economy.

Prior records:
 FY2008 (Flood Damages prevention - $123.39 million (total to date); Visitor Expenditures - 34.75 million)
 FY2007 (Flood Damages prevention - $116.9 million (total to date))
 FY2006 (Flood Damages prevention - $116.5 million (total to date); Visitor Expenditures - 34.6 million)
 FY2004 (Flood Damages prevention - 109.2 million (total to date); Visitor Expenditures - 33.0 million)
 FY2003 (Flood Damages prevention - 101.9 million (total to date); Visitor Expenditures - 30.3 million)
 FY2002 (Visitor Expenditures - 30.2 million)

Under former Mayor Robert L. Miller, Campbellsville developed a water line from Green River Lake to serve the city, the seat of Taylor County.

See also
Green River Lake State Park

References

External links
 Green River Lake State Park facilities map
Benefits of the Lake at US DoD
 Rainfall Reports 1984-2009

Reservoirs in Kentucky
1969 establishments in Kentucky
Protected areas of Adair County, Kentucky
Protected areas of Casey County, Kentucky
Protected areas of Taylor County, Kentucky
Bodies of water of Adair County, Kentucky
Bodies of water of Casey County, Kentucky
Bodies of water of Taylor County, Kentucky
Green River (Kentucky)